Puerto Rico Highway 188 (PR-188) is a north–south highway that travels from Canóvanas, Puerto Rico to Loíza. It begins at its intersection with PR-66 in Canóvanas and ends at its junction with PR-187 near downtown Loíza.

Major intersections

See also

 List of highways numbered 188

References

External links
 

188